Amrita Singh (born 9 February 1958) is an Indian actress. Through her films such as Betaab and Mard, she gained popularity and became a well-known and popular actress in the 1980s. She took a break from acting in the early 1990s for a decade and returned to acting in 2002, occasionally playing supporting roles. She also made her debut on television in 2005.  Singh keeps a low public profile and gives seldom interviews, only on occasional basis.

Early life 
Amrita Singh was born on 9 February 1958 to Rukhsana Sultana and an army officer Shivinder Singh Virk. Her mother was a political associate of Sanjay Gandhi during the Indian Emergency in the 1970s, who became known for leading Sanjay Gandhi's sterilisation campaign in Muslim areas of Old Delhi. Through her paternal grandmother Mohinder Kaur, Amrita is the great-granddaughter of Sobha Singh, one of the builders of New Delhi, the grandniece of the late novelist Khushwant Singh, and great-grandniece of politician Ujjal Singh. The actress Begum Para is her great-aunt and her husband was Nasir Khan, who is the brother of Dilip Kumar. Actor Ayub Khan is her uncle (second cousin once removed). Singh was a childhood friend of Shah Rukh Khan. Their mothers often worked together in the Old Delhi area and Singh attended the same school as Khan's sister, Shahnaz.

Singh attended Modern School in New Delhi and is fluent in English, Punjabi and Hindi.

Career

1983–1993 
Singh made her Bollywood debut in 1983 with Betaab, an highly successful romantic drama in which she was paired with Sunny Deol. This was quickly followed by a succession of hits, such as Sunny (1984), Mard (which was the biggest hit of 1985) and Saaheb (also 1985), Chameli Ki Shaadi and Naam (both 1986), Khudgarz (1987), and Waaris (1988). Singh made a successful pair in several films, not only with Sunny Deol, Sanjay Dutt, and Raj Babbar, but also with Jeetendra, Vinod Khanna, Anil Kapoor and Amitabh Bachchan, some of the leading actors of the 1980s. As well as playing leading roles, she also played supporting negative roles in films such as Raju Ban Gaya Gentleman (1992), Suryavanshi (1992) and Aaina (1993), winning the Filmfare Award for Best Supporting Actress for the lattermost. Her comic timings in films such as Saaheb and Chameli Ki Shaadi are still remembered. She decided to retire into family life and quit acting after her appearance in Rang (1993).

2002–present 
Singh returned to acting in 2002 with 23rd March 1931: Shaheed, in which she played the mother of Bhagat Singh (played by Bobby Deol). She joined the television industry with Ekta Kapoor's family drama Kavyanjali, which aired on Star Plus in 2005. In the show, Singh was seen in a negative role that soon gained immense popularity. Later that year, she won acclaim for her performance in yet another negative role for the film Kalyug. In 2007, Singh played the role of gangster Maya Dolas' mother, Ratnaprabha Dolas, in the Sanjay Gupta film Shootout at Lokhandwala, directed by Apoorva Lakhia - Vivek Oberoi played the role of Maya Dolas. Later on, she appeared in the anthology film Dus Kahaniyaan, where she appeared in the short story Poornmasi.

Continuing her acting journey, Singh was seen in Kajraare (2010), and also appeared in Aurangzeb (2012) under the Yash Raj Films banner, where she was paired with Jackie Shroff after almost two decades, after having paired together in Aaina. In 2014, she was seen in 2 States, produced by Dharma Productions, portraying the role of co-actor Arjun Kapoor's mother. The film was released on 18 April 2014, and was a critical and commercial success, and also earned Singh a nomination for the Filmfare Award for Best Supporting Actress. In 2016, she appeared in Flying Jat playing Tiger Shroff's mother. In 2017, she appeared in the comedy-drama Hindi Medium as a school principal. In 2019, she appeared in Sujoy Ghosh's Badla, reuniting with Amitabh Bachchan after 18 years. Badla met with highly positive reviews, and Singh's performance received high critical acclaim. The film proved to be a commercial success, and Singh's performance earned her a nomination for the Filmfare Award for Best Supporting Actress.

Personal life 
Singh married actor Saif Ali Khan in January 1991. Singh, who was raised as a Sikh, converted to Islam before marriage and the couple had an Islamic wedding. 12 years younger, Khan is the son of former Indian test cricket captain Mansoor Ali Khan Pataudi, the ninth Nawab of Pataudi and actress Sharmila Tagore and is a member of the royal family of the erstwhile Bhopal State and Pataudi State. Despite controversies, they remained married. She gave up acting after her marriage to Khan. After thirteen years of marriage, the couple divorced in 2004. Their daughter Sara Ali Khan Pataudi was born on 12 August 1995. and son Ibrahim Ali Khan Pataudi on 5 March 2001. Sara graduated from Columbia University and their son, Ibrahim Ali Khan is studying in England.

Filmography

Films

Television

Awards and nominations 

Film

 Television

References

External links 

 
 

1958 births
20th-century Indian actresses
21st-century Indian actresses
Actors from Mumbai
Actresses in Hindi cinema
Actresses in Hindi television
Converts to Islam from Sikhism
Former Sikhs
Indian film actresses
Indian television actresses
Living people
Punjabi women
Filmfare Awards winners